The Victoria Rifles of Canada was an infantry regiment of the Non-Permanent Active Militia of the Canadian Militia and later the Canadian Army. First formed in Montreal, Quebec in 1862, the regiment would see a history of service stretching from the Fenian Raids of the 1860s-70s right into the middle of the 20th Century. In 1965, the regiment was reduced to nil strength and transferred to the Supplementary Order of Battle.

Lineage

The Victoria Rifles of Canada 

 Originated on 22 January 1862, in Montreal, Quebec, as The 3rd Battalion Volunteer Militia Rifles Canada.
 Redesignated on 18 July, 1862, as the 3rd Battalion, The Victoria Volunteer Rifles of Montreal.
 Redesignated on 5 December, 1879, as the 3rd Battalion Victoria Rifles of Canada.
 Redesignated on 8 May, 1900, as the 3rd Regiment Victoria Rifles of Canada.
 Redesignated on 29 March, 1920, as The Victoria Rifles of Canada.
 Redesignated on 15 November, 1934, as Victoria Rifles of Canada.
 Redesignated on 7 November, 1941, as the 2nd (Reserve) Battalion, Victoria Rifles of Canada.
 Redesignated on 1 June, 1945, as the Victoria Rifles of Canada.
 Reduced to Nil Strength on 5 March, 1965, and Transferred to the Supplementary Order of Battle.

Lineage Chart 
Lineage of the Victoria Rifles of Canada:

|-
|style="text-align: left;"|
 class="wikitable"
+ Abbreviations used in the chart
-
! Abbreviation !! Phrase
-
 Bn  Battalion
-
 CASF  Canadian Active Service Force
-
 CEF  Canadian Expeditionary Force
-
 Coy  Company
-
 Regt  Regiment

|-
|style="text-align: left;"|Notes:

Perpetuations 
The Victoria Rifles of Canada perpetuate the following units:

 24th Battalion (Victoria Rifles), CEF
 60th Battalion (Victoria Rifles of Canada), CEF
 244th Battalion (Kitchener's Own), CEF

Operational history

The Fenian Raids
The battalion was called out on active service during the 1866 Fenian Raids from 8 March to 31 March 1866, and during the 1870 Fenian Raids from 24 May to 24 June 1870.

During the Fenian raids, the Victoria Rifles participated in the Campobello fiasco in Cornwall with other regiments like the Royal Scots. In 1866 several companies from the Victoria Rifles were sent to reinforce defences in St-Jean, Lachine and Cornwall.

The raids of 1870 were the least effective of the Fenian attempts against Canada. The effort four years earlier at Campobello had the most far-reaching effects, as it induced New Brunswick and Nova Scotia to enter Confederation, while operations in Canada East and Canada West brought about a martial spirit similar to that which swept the United States at the outbreak of the Civil War. Because the campaign was of short duration, there was no time for disenchantment. Yet the raids of 1866 were clearly unfinished business, as the Brotherhood declared by warlike preparation.

The South African War

The Victoria Rifles contributed volunteers for the Canadian Contingents during the Boer War, mainly as part of the 2nd (Special Service) Battalion of The Royal Canadian Regiment.

Between 1885 and 1902, The Rifles were sometimes called upon to help quell civil disruptions in Montreal and Valleyfield.

The Great War
During the Great War, details of the regiment were placed on active service on 6 August 1914 for local protection duties.

The 24th Battalion (Victoria Rifles), CEF, was authorized on 7 November 1914 and embarked for Great Britain on 11 May 1915, arriving in France on 16 September 1915, where it fought as part of the 5th Canadian Infantry Brigade, 2nd Canadian Division in France and Flanders until the end of the war. The 24th Battalion was disbanded on 15 September 1920.

The 60th Battalion (Victoria Rifles of Canada), CEF, was authorized on 20 April 1915, embarked for Great Britain on 4 November 1915 and arrived in France on 21 February 1916, where it fought as part of the 9th Canadian Infantry Brigade, 3rd Canadian Division in France and Flanders until 30 April 1917, when its personnel were absorbed by the 5th Battalion, Canadian Mounted Rifles, CEF, and the 87th Battalion (Canadian Grenadier Guards), CEF. The battalion was disbanded on 15 August 1918.

The 244th Battalion (Kitchener's Own), CEF, was authorized on 15 July 1916 and embarked for Great Britain on 28 March 1917 where its personnel were absorbed by the 23rd Reserve Battalion, CEF, on 21 April 1917 to provide reinforcements for units of the Canadian Corps in the field. The battalion was disbanded on 15 Sept 1920.

The Second World War
During the Second World War, the regiment was called out on service for local protection duties on 26 August 1939 and details of the regiment were also mobilized for active service under the designation Victoria Rifles of Canada, CASF (Details) on 1 September 1939. The details called out on active service were disbanded on 31 December 1940 and the regiment mobilized an active service unit designated as The Victoria Rifles of Canada, CASF, on 24 May 1940. It was redesignated as the 1st Battalion, The Victoria Rifles of Canada, CASF, on 7 November 1940. It served in Canada, and in Newfoundland from November 1940 to September 1941 on garrison duty as part of the 17th Infantry Brigade, 7th Canadian Division. The 1st Battalion embarked for Great Britain on 20 November 1944, and it was disbanded the next day, on 21 November 1944, to provide reinforcements to the Canadian Army in the field.

Organization

3rd Battalion Volunteer Militia Rifles Canada (22 January, 1862) 

 Regimental Headquarters (Montreal, Quebec)
 No. 1 Company (Montreal, Quebec) (first raised on 10 January, 1862 as the 1st Rifle Company of Montreal)
 No. 2 Company (Montreal, Quebec) (first raised on 10 January, 1862 as the 2nd Rifle Company of Montreal)
 No. 3 Company (Montreal, Quebec) (first raised on 10 January, 1862 as the 3rd Rifle Company of Montreal)
 No. 4 Company (Montreal, Quebec) (first raised on 28 February, 1862 as the 4th Rifle Company of Montreal)
 No. 5 Company (Montreal, Quebec) (first raised on 28 February, 1862 as the 5th Rifle Company of Montreal)
 No. 6 Company (Montreal, Quebec) (first raised on 28 February, 1862 as the 6th Rifle Company of Montreal)

3rd Regiment Victoria Rifles of Canada (15 December, 1914) 

 Regimental Headquarters (Montreal, Quebec)
 A Company (Montreal, Quebec)
 B Company (Montreal, Quebec)
 C Company (Montreal, Quebec)
 D Company (Montreal, Quebec)

The Victoria Rifles of Canada (1 December, 1920) 

 1st Battalion (perpetuating the 24th Battalion, CEF)
 2nd Battalion (perpetuating the 60th Battalion, CEF)
 3rd Battalion (perpetuating the 244th Battalion, CEF)

Alliances 

  - The King's Royal Rifle Corps (Until 1965)

Battle Honours
Those battle honours in bold type are emblazoned on the regimental unit appointments.

The Fenian Raids

The South African War

The Great War

Flers-Courcelette
Thiepval
Ancre Heights

Vimy, 1917
Arleux
Scarpe, 1917, '18

Passchendaele

Canal du Nord
Cambrai, 1918

Notable Members 

 Major General Charles Basil Price 
 Lieutenant General Robert Moncel 
 Lieutenant Colonel William Osborne Smith

Notes

References 
 A Brief History of the Active Service Battalion of the Victoria Rifles. 24th Battalion, 5th Brigade, 2nd Division Canadian Expeditionary Forces 1914-15 by Canada. Canadian Army. 24th Battalion (Victoria Rifles of Canada) (Jan 1 1915)
 From the War Diaries of Sgt. J.W. Kennedy, M.M. and Bar, Second Canadian Division, 24th Battalion, Victoria Rifles by J. W. Kennedy (Jan 2007) 
 The 24th Battalion, C.E.F., Victoria Rifles of Canada 1914-1919 by R.C. Fetherstonhaugh (1930)

Victoria Rifles of Canada
Military units and formations of Quebec
1862 establishments in Canada
Military units and formations established in 1862
Military units and formations disestablished in 1965
Supplementary Order of Battle